Cameroon participated at the 2017 Summer Universiade which was held in Taipei, Taiwan.

Cameroon sent a delegation consisting of only 2 competitors for the event competing in a single sporting event. Cameroon did not claim any medals at the multi-sport event.

Participants

Athletics

Track Events

Field Events

References 

2017 in Cameroonian sport
Nations at the 2017 Summer Universiade